The first inauguration of Woodrow Wilson as the 28th president of the United States was held on Tuesday, March 4, 1913, at the East Portico of the United States Capitol in Washington, D.C. This was the 32nd inauguration and marked the commencement of the first four-year term of Woodrow Wilson as president and Thomas R. Marshall as vice president. Chief Justice Edward D. White administered the presidential oath of office to Wilson.

In his inaugural address, Wilson made clear his vision of the United States and its people as an exemplary moral force: "Nowhere else in the world have noble men and women exhibited in more striking forms the beauty and the energy of sympathy and helpfulness and counsel in their efforts to rectify wrong, alleviate suffering, and set the weak in the way of strength and hope". No inaugural balls were held to celebrate the occasion, as Wilson found them inappropriate for the occasion.

The day before his inauguration, Wilson expected crowds to meet him at the train station when he arrived in Washington. However, more people were watching the Woman Suffrage Procession organized by Alice Paul.

See also
Presidency of Woodrow Wilson
Second inauguration of Woodrow Wilson
1912 United States presidential election

References

External links

Text of Wilson's First Inaugural Address

United States presidential inaugurations
1913 in Washington, D.C.
1913 in American politics
Inauguration 1
March 1913 events in the United States